The name Hartwick has multiple uses:

People
Anna Elisabeth Hartwick (1796–1882), Swedish lace industrialist
John Christopher Hartwick (1714–1796), Lutheran minister in colonial America.
Edward Hartwick (1871–1918), soldier and namesake of Hartwick Pines State Park

Places

United States
Hartwick, Iowa, a city in Powesheik County
Hartwick, Delaware County, Iowa
Hartwick, New York
Hartwick (CDP), New York
Hartwick Township, Michigan
Hartwick Pines State Park

Institutions
Hartwick College, Oneonta, New York

See also
 Hardwick (disambiguation)